Catherine Wingfield may refer to:

Catherine Woodville, Duchess of Buckingham, married name Catherine Wingfield
Catherine Wingfield, heiress of Wingfield Castle, wife of Michael de la Pole